William Durst may refer to:

 William Frederick Durst (born 1970), also known as Fred Durst, founder of band Limp Bizkit
 Will Durst (born 1952), American political satirist